Ranjita Rane (28 October 1977 – 26 May 2021) was an Indian cricketer. She played 44 first-class cricket matches representing Mumbai from 1995 to 2003. She began her career at the Indian Gymkhana in Matunga before playing for Mumbai in first-class matches.

She died on 26 May 2021 after being diagnosed with cancer.

References 

1977 births
2021 deaths
Indian women cricketers
Mumbai women cricketers
Deaths from cancer in India
Cricketers from Mumbai